The Canadian Transportation Agency (CTA; , OTC) is the independent, quasi-judicial tribunal of the Government of Canada that makes decisions relating to federally-regulated modes of transportation (air, rail and marine). Its headquarters are in the Jules Léger Building (South) (Édifice Jules Léger (Sud)) in Terrasses de la Chaudière, Gatineau, Quebec.

It is responsible for:
Dispute resolution: to resolve complaints about transportation services, fares, rates, and charges;
 Accessibility: to ensure that the national transportation system is accessible, particularly to persons with disabilities; and 
 Economic regulation: to provide approvals and licences and to make decisions on matters involving federally regulated air, rail, and marine transportation.

The agency is divided into five branches: Chair's Office; Corporate Management Branch; Legal and Alternative Dispute Resolution Services Branch; Dispute Resolution Branch; Industry Regulation and Determinations Branch.

The agency is headed by five full-time members, including the chairman and chief executive officer, and the vice chairman.

History
The history of the Canadian Transportation Agency originates in February 1904 with the establishment of the Board of Railway Commissioners, an independent body with regulatory authority over railway, and later with jurisdiction over telegraphs, telephones, and express companies.

The Board of Railway Commissioners was replaced by the Board of Transportation Commissioners through the Transport Act in 1938; this new agency held authority over inland waterways and airlines in addition to those jurisdictions inherited by the Board of Railway Commissioners. On 11 September 1944, amendments to the Transport Act provided for "the removal of commercial air services from the jurisdiction of the Board of Transport Commissioners." At the same time, the Aeronautics Act created a new Air Transport Board to provide licensing and regulatory functions.

In 1967, National Transportation Act became law and established the Canadian Transport Commission (CTC)—absorbing most of the members and staff from the previous Board of Transport Commissioners, the Air Transport Board, and the Canadian Maritime Commission—with Jack Pickersgill as president. The CTC was given mandate over all modes of transportation in Canada, "with the object of co-ordinating and harmonizing the operations of all carriers engaged in transport by railways, water, aircraft, extra-provincial motor vehicle transport and commodity pipelines."

In 1988, the new National Transportation Act overhauled the CTC and replaced it with the National Transportation Agency. On 1996 May 29, the Canada Transportation Act, also known as Bill C-14 (formerly C-101), received royal assent and established the Canadian Transportation Agency, which began operations on July 2.

Consumer responsibilities were expanded in 2000, when the post of Air Travel Complaints Commissioner was created under its stewardship. The first Air Travel Complaints Commissioner was Bruce Hood, a former veteran National Hockey League referee.

In 2020, the agency received 8000 complaints between March and September over airline policies to issue travel vouchers rather than refunds for passengers cancelling their flight bookings during the COVID-19 pandemic. The CTA posted on their website that airlines could issue travel vouchers instead of refunds, which caused Air Passenger Rights, an advocacy association, to file a lawsuit for CTA to remove this statement.

Legislation 

The Canada Transportation Act is the Agency's enabling statute to implement the federal government's transportation policy.

The Agency also shares responsibility for administering other Acts and their related regulations, including:

 Accessible Canada Act, 2019
Canada Marine Act
Canadian Environmental Assessment Act, 2012
 Civil Air Navigation Services Commercialization Act
 Coasting Trade Act 
 Energy Supplies Emergency Act 
Pilotage Act 
Railway Relocation and Crossing Act 
Railway Safety Act 
 Shipping Conferences Exemption Act, 1987

Certificate of Fitness
The CTA is responsible for the issuance of a Certificate of Fitness for each federal railway. A board is required to evaluate details like insurance coverage, without which the railway cannot maintain its Certificate of Fitness.

References

External links 

 

Transport in Canada
Federal departments and agencies of Canada
Canadian transport law
Organizations based in Gatineau